Donald McAllister (born 19 November 1935) is an Australian cricketer. He played in three first-class matches for South Australia in 1964/65.

See also
 List of South Australian representative cricketers

References

External links
 

1935 births
Living people
Australian cricketers
South Australia cricketers
Cricketers from Adelaide